Hemilophus is a genus of longhorn beetles of the subfamily Lamiinae, containing the following species:

 Hemilophus dimidiaticornis Audinet-Serville, 1835
 Hemilophus infuscatus Bates, 1881
 Hemilophus leucogrammus Bates, 1881
 Hemilophus unicolor Bates, 1881

References

Hemilophini